Causal layered analysis (CLA) is a technique used in strategic planning, futures studies and foresight to more effectively shape the future. The technique was pioneered by Sohail Inayatullah, a Pakistani-Australian futures studies researcher.

Theory

Causal layered analysis works by identifying many different levels, and attempting to make synchronized changes at all levels to create a coherent new future. Inayatullah's original paper as well as his TEDx talk identify four levels:

 The litany: This includes quantitative trends, often exaggerated and used for political purposes. The result could be a feeling of apathy, helplessness, or projected action. Inayatullah calls this "the conventional level of futures research which can readily create a politics of fear."
 Social causes, including economic, cultural, political, and historical factors.
 Structure and the discourse that legitimizes and supports the structure.
 Metaphor and myth

History of research

CLA was first introduced explicitly as a futures research technique by Sohail Inayatullah in a 1998 article for Futures that would come to be widely cited. Later, Inayatullah would edit the CLA Reader, that featured chapters from a number of futurists and practitioners describing their experience with CLA.

Inayatullah's work on CLA was examined in a book by Jose W. Ramos in 2003.

A 2008 article by Chris Riedy examined the similarities, differences, and possible combinations of CLA and Ken Wilber's integral theory.

A 2010 article by Gary P. Hampson explored the relationship between integral futures and CLA further, and also considered Richard Slaughter's critique of CLA.

Sohail Inayatullah and Ivana Milojevic have published an update in 2015. With various authors, they investigate topics such as:
 The Global Financial Crisis
 Terrorism futures
 Global governance
 Ageing and the changing workforce
 Educational and university futures
 Climate change
 Water futures in the Muslim world
 The alternative futures of China
 Agricultural policy in Australia
 The new national narrative in Singapore

See also

 Futures techniques
 Backcasting

References

Futures techniques